Jill Nicole Filipovic (born August 3, 1983) is an American author and lawyer.

Education
Originally from the Seattle area, Filipovic attended Shorewood High School. She earned a Bachelor of Arts in journalism and politics and a minor in gender and sexuality studies from New York University. She then earned a Juris Doctor from the New York University School of Law in 2008.

Career
Filipovic was hired by Cosmopolitan to write for the cosmopolitan.com blog in April 2014. Prior to that, she was a columnist for The Guardian, and, since 2005, a blogger at Feministe, one of the largest feminist blogs. She has written articles and essays for The New York Times, The Washington Post, Time, and CNN, and has authored two books: The H-Spot: The Feminist Pursuit of Happiness (2017) and OK Boomer, Let's Talk: How My Generation Got Left Behind (2020).

Men's rights groups
Filipovic has been an outspoken critic of the website A Voice for Men. Michelle Goldberg, writing in The Washington Post, said she had been "singled out by [men's rights groups]" for her criticism. She was also cited in Hate Crimes in Cyberspace as a victim of hate crimes for her feminism. According to Kerryn Goldsworthy, she has been googlebombed by her detractors.

TSA and civil liberties
A Transportation Security Administration (TSA) screener was fired after Filipovic blogged about an incident in which a handwritten comment was left in her luggage. She later wrote "I would much prefer a look at why 'security' has been used to justify so many intrusions into our civil liberties."

Beauty pageants
Filipovic has written about beauty pageants, saying "the norms that these contests promote are unfortunately not ... obsolete ... we pay lip service to women's rights, but focus more on how good women look in a bathing suit."

Name changes
Filipovic's opposition to name change for women who marry, published in The Guardian in 2013 as "Why should married women change their names? Let men change theirs", was cited as recommended reading on the social construction of gender in Critical Encounters in Secondary English: Teaching Literacy Theory to Adolescents by Deborah Appleman (2014). Filipovic married Ty Lohrer McCormick in 2018, and kept her last name upon marriage.

Domestic violence and asylum
Filipovic has criticized Jeff Sessions' directive to refuse grants of asylum to women fleeing domestic violence. She emphasized that women who suffer domestic violence in places where the government refuses to protect them are being persecuted. She stated: "Sessions, because of his deep antipathy toward immigrants and his misogynistic worldview that domestic violence is a private family matter, has undercut this promise of safe harbor – and taken a law meant for protection and turned it into a cudgel of sexist cruelty."

She has also written about how the complete prohibition of abortion in Honduras drives women who are victims of sexual violence to migrate from the country.

Personal life
Filipovic is of Serbian and German descent through her father's side of the family. She married Ty Lohrer McCormick in 2018.

Awards
2015 Society of Professional Journalists Sigma Delta Chi Award, best online column writing
2015 Planned Parenthood Federation of America Maggie Award for Media Excellence for best TV and online reporting
2014 Society of Professional Journalists Sigma Delta Chi Award, best online column writing
2014 Newswomen's Club of New York Front Page Award for opinion/ criticism

Bibliography

See also
 New Yorkers in journalism

References

Sources

External links

1983 births
Living people
American feminist writers
American women bloggers
American bloggers
American people of Serbian descent
Cosmopolitan (magazine) people
New York University School of Law alumni
Writers from New York City
Writers from Seattle
21st-century American women writers
21st-century American writers
Shorewood High School (Washington) alumni